Elections to Dudley Metropolitan Borough Council were held on 4 May 2006.  One third of the council was up for election and the Conservatives retained control of the council, while Labour gained one seat and the Liberal Democrats lost one seat.

Election result

Ward results

Amblecote

Belle Vale

Brierley Hill

Brockmoor and Pensnett

Castle and Priory

Coseley East

Cradley and Foxcote

Gornal

Halesowen North

Halesowen South

Hayley Green and Cradley South

Kingswinford North and Wall Heath

Kingswinford South

Lye and Wollescote

Netherton, Woodside and St Andrews

Norton

Pedmore and Stourbridge East

Quarry Bank and Dudley Wood

St James's

St Thomas's

Sedgley

Upper Gornal and Woodsetton

Wollaston and Stourbridge Town

Wordsley

References

Dudley Council elections
Dudley